Marvin Jay Marquez Cuyugan (born January 29, 1979), known professionally as Marvin Agustin, is a Filipino actor, chef and entrepreneur.

Early life
Agustin is the youngest and the only male child of Theresa and Danilo Cuyugan and has two older sisters. He learned acting through his mother.

Television career

Agustin is one of the Star Magic talents during 1990s. He started his television career in 1996 through ABS-CBN's youth oriented show Gimik and was paired with singer-actress Jolina Magdangal. He was also chosen to be one of the lead casts of soap opera Esperanza and miniseries Sa Sandaling Kailangan Mo Ako. He was paired with Magdangal once again and they become the protagonists of soap opera Labs Ko Si Babe, the first Philippine romantic-comedy series. 

After Labs Ko si Babe ended in 2000, he became part of the trio named Whattamen together with his real life best friends Dominic Ochoa and Rico Yan. The trio became the replacement hosts for Willie Revillame in the defunct noontime show, Magandang Tanghali Bayan from 2001 to 2003. On 2001, they were tapped to head the sitcom Whattamen. It continued until 2004 even though Yan passed away on 2002. His life story was featured in drama anthology Maalaala Mo Kaya on one of its episodes in 2005.  

Agustin won his first TV and film acting awards for his performance as Filipino boxing champion Manny Pacquiao in the episode of "Boxing Gloves" in Magpakailanman in 2004's 1st Golden Screen Entertainment TV Awards, and as a disturbed psycho Lemuel in the horror-thriller Kutob in 2005's 31st Metro Manila Film Festival.

On 2005, it was discovered that Agustin transferred to GMA Network. His loveteam with Jolina Magdangal came back in the television through I Luv NY. He also received his first villain role in 2007 through action series Asian Treasures and received another villain role in the same year through the Filipino adaptation of Marimar.

He played a hunchback Gabriel in Mga Mata ni Anghelita. He joined the cast of Babangon Ako't Dudurugin Kita for a period and has  played one of the villains in LaLola.

Agustin also hosted a musical variety show on GMA Network in SOP Rules and a youth oriented drama anthology Dear Friend and hosts a comedy informative show in Outrageous & Courageous. He is part on the drama mini series SRO Cinemaserye: Ganti Ng Puso.

Agustin starred in the romantic-comedy film Adik Sa'Yo and recent appears as Lando in a drama mini-series, Tinik Sa Dibdib and appeared in Panday Kids, which he plays "Lizardo", a villain of the Panday Kids. Agustin formerly hosts the variety show, Party Pilipinas and is also a former part of the cast in Pilyang Kerubin.

Agustin appeared in the series of GMA Network, Beauty Queen in October 2010. Agustin also appeared in a drama series Iglot on GMA in 2011. he later transferred to TV5 as of 2012.

In 2014, he returned to ABS-CBN along with Jolina Magdangal. His last appearance in the network is Maalaala Mo Kaya. In 2017, Agustin briefly returned with an exclusive contract to GMA Network three years later via his drama series Kambal, Karibal (originally titled as Santa Santita).

Cooking and business career
Agustin attended International School for Culinary Arts and Hotel Management, he joint ventured with the restaurant entrepreneurs and called it Sumo Sam, which specializes in Japanese-American modern cuisine. He also co-owns a Japanese restaurant called John and Yoko, as well as the Cafe Ten Titas restaurant.

Aside from restaurants, he also owns Futuretainment Inc. (portmanteau of future and entertainment), a company specializing in production of concerts and events. Recently, the company debuted in television content production through Kanta Pilipinas, a singing contest on TV5.

Personal life
Agustin practiced archery in hopes of making it to the 16th Asian Games in Guangzhou, China in November 2008.

Filmography

Television

Movies

Awards and nominations

References

External links
 Marvin Agustin - Official Website

1977 births
Living people
20th-century Filipino male actors
21st-century Filipino male actors
ABS-CBN personalities
Businesspeople from Metro Manila
Filipino chefs
Filipino restaurateurs
Filipino male child actors
Filipino male comedians
Filipino male television actors
GMA Network personalities
Male actors from Manila
Star Magic personalities
Viva Artists Agency
Filipino male film actors